Paprika is a 1933 French comedy film directed by Jean de Limur and starring Irène Zilahy, René Lefèvre and Pierre Etchepare. It was based on a play by Max Reimann and Otto Schwartz. A German-language version Paprika had been released the previous year.

Cast
 Irène Zilahy as Ila 
 René Lefèvre as Paul Charvin 
 Pierre Etchepare as Max Charvin 
 Christiane Delyne as Juliette Charvin 
 Fernand Charpin as Urbain 
 Germaine Michel as Albertine 
 Maryanne as Anna

References

Bibliography
 Oscherwitz, Dayna & Higgins, MaryEllen. The A to Z of French Cinema. Scarecrow Press, 2009.

External links

1933 films
French comedy films
1930s French-language films
French films based on plays
Films directed by Jean de Limur
French multilingual films
Remakes of German films
French black-and-white films
1933 comedy films
1933 multilingual films
1930s French films